Rhodirphia is a genus of moths in the family Saturniidae first described by Charles Duncan Michener in 1949.

Species
Rhodirphia carminata (Schaus, 1902)

References

Hemileucinae